A sock hop or sox hop, often also called a record hop or just a hop, was an informal sponsored dance event for teenagers in mid-20th-century North America, featuring popular music.

History 
Sock hops were held as early as 1944 by the American Junior Red Cross to raise funds during World War II. They then became a fad among American teenagers in 1948. Sock hops were commonly held at high schools and other educational institutions, often in the school gymnasium or cafeteria. The term came about because dancers were required to remove their hard-soled shoes to protect the varnished floor of the gymnasium. The music at a sock hop was usually played from vinyl records, sometimes presented by a disc jockey. Occasionally there were also live bands. 

In later years, "hops" became strongly associated with the 1950s and early rock and roll. "At the Hop", a song by Danny & the Juniors that debuted in 1957, names many popular and novelty dances and otherwise documented what occurred at a hop. In subsequent decades, with the widespread popularity of sneakers and other types of indoors-only footwear, the practice of removing shoes was dropped.  The term then came to be applied more generally to any informal dance for teenagers.

Revival
The term caught on in England in the late 1980s during a British rockabilly revival, led by groups like The Stray Cats.  "Life Begins at the Hop", a song celebrating sock hops, became the first charting single for XTC. Owl City song "Fireflies" makes reference to the sock hop in the second verse.

See also 

 Sokkie - a similar idea in South Africa
 School dance - modern incarnation of sock hops, shoes typically being mandatory for safety purposes (to avoid slipping and falling, shoe theft, etc.)
 Prom - formal school dance in North American high schools, usually held for seniors (and sometimes juniors in a 'junior prom') at the end of the school year
 Social dance
Bobby soxer

References

External links 

Dance culture
American culture
School dances
1950s fads and trends